The Men's 100 metres B1 was a track event in athletics at the 1992 Summer Paralympics, for visually impaired athletes. It consisted of a single race.

There was a tie for gold between Sergei Sevastianov and Julio Requena.

Results

Final

References 

Men's 100 metres B1